The 2002 Illinois Fighting Illini football team represented the University of Illinois at Urbana–Champaign in the 2002 NCAA Division I-A football season. They participated as members of the Big Ten Conference. Their home games were played at Memorial Stadium in Champaign, Illinois.  The team's head coach was Ron Turner, who was in his sixth season with the Illini.  Illinois had a record of 5–7 and failed to make a bowl game.

Schedule

Roster

Team players in the NFL

References

Illinois
Illinois Fighting Illini football seasons
Illinois Fighting Illini football